Vorpommern-Greifswald is a district in the east of Mecklenburg-Vorpommern, Germany. It is bounded by (from the west and clockwise) the districts of Mecklenburgische Seenplatte and Vorpommern-Rügen, the Baltic Sea, Poland (West Pomeranian Voivodeship) and the state of Brandenburg. The district seat is the University and Hanseatic City of Greifswald. A lake called Berliner See is found in the district.

History 
Vorpommern-Greifswald District was established by merging the former districts of Ostvorpommern and Uecker-Randow; along with the subdivisions of Jarmen-Tutow and Peenetal/Loitz (from the former district of Demmin), and the former district-free town Greifswald, as part of the local government reform of September 2011. The name of the district was decided by referendum on 4 September 2011. The project name for the district was Südvorpommern.

Geography
The district has a number of lakes including:

The island of Usedom within the district also has a number of lakes.

Towns and municipalities

References

External links

Official website of Vorpommern-Greifswald district (includes translator)